Daniel Ortiz (born January 5, 1990) is a Puerto Rican professional baseball outfielder for the Pericos de Puebla of the Mexican League. He has previously played in Major League Baseball (MLB) for the Pittsburgh Pirates.

Career

Minnesota Twins
Ortiz was drafted in the fourth round (126th overall) by the Minnesota Twins in the 2008 MLB draft out of Benjamin Harrison High School in Cayey, Puerto Rico. After signing for $253,000, Ortiz reported to the GCL Twins where batted .274 with two home runs and 27 runs batted in over 48 games. Daniel was forced to miss the 2009 season after undergoing left knee surgery during the offseason. Ortiz did little to change that perception over the next two years, hitting .259 with 11 homers and 43 runs batted in over 62 games with the Elizabethton Twins in 2010 and .239 with 10 homers and 71 runs batted in the following year with the Low-A Beloit Snappers. For the 2012 season, Ortiz began the year back with the Snappers but quickly proved that he was a changed player, hitting .299 with 8 runs and 13 runs batted in through only 22 games and earning himself a spot on the midseason Midwest League all-star team. Ortiz started the month of May with the High-A Fort Myers Miracle. Over the rest of the season, Ortiz continued to hit for both average and power, finishing with a .269 batting average, eight home runs and 35 runs batted in. Ortiz was promoted again to begin the 2013 year, playing for the Double-A New Britain Rock Cats. Ortiz hit a career high 12 home runs to go along with a .258 batting average and 60 runs batted in. In 2014 Ortiz remained with the Rock Cats for 48 games, and he owned a .500 slugging percentage, a .325 batting average, and 31 runs batted in before an early June call up to the Rochester Red Wings. In 55 games since his promotion, Ortiz hit 7 home runs, drove in 29 runs, recorded a slugging percentage of .456, and owned a .257 batting average.

Pittsburgh Pirates
Ortiz signed a minor league contract with the Pittsburgh Pirates on November 20, 2015. He spent the 2016 season in Triple-A with the Indianapolis Indians, batting .236/.275/.415 with 15 home runs and 61 RBI in 110 games. The Pirates promoted him to the major leagues on April 29, 2017. Ortiz appeared in 9 games for Pirates in 2017, notching 1 hit in 12-bats. On August 5, 2017, Ortiz was designated for assignment by the Pirates and sent him outright to Indianapolis on August 7. He elected free agency on November 6, 2017.

Philadelphia Phillies
Ortiz signed a minor league contract with the Philadelphia Phillies on January 3, 2018, with an invitation to spring training. He was assigned to AAA Lehigh Valley IronPigs for the 2018 season, after which he became a free agent.

Pericos de Puebla
On February 21, 2019, Ortiz signed with the Pericos de Puebla of the Mexican League. In 2019, he was a mid-season All-Star. Ortiz did not play in a game in 2020 due to the cancellation of the LMB season because of the COVID-19 pandemic.

See also
 List of Major League Baseball players from Puerto Rico

References

External links

1990 births
Living people
Beloit Snappers players
Fort Myers Miracle players
Gulf Coast Twins players
Elizabethton Twins players
Indianapolis Indians players
Indios de Mayagüez players
Lehigh Valley IronPigs players
Major League Baseball outfielders
Major League Baseball players from Puerto Rico
Mexican League baseball right fielders
New Britain Rock Cats players
People from Caguas, Puerto Rico
Pericos de Puebla players
Pittsburgh Pirates players
Puerto Rican expatriate baseball players in Mexico
Rochester Red Wings players
Tigres de Aragua players
Puerto Rican expatriate baseball players in Venezuela
Sultanes de Monterrey players